Tadeusz Kondrat (8 April 1908 – 19 June 1994) was a Polish actor. He appeared in more than 20 films between 1954 and 1979.

Selected filmography
 Kwiecień (1961)
 Lalka (1968), as Szlangbaum 
 The Hourglass Sanatorium (1973)

References

External links

1908 births
1994 deaths
Polish male film actors
People from Przemyśl
Polish male stage actors
Recipients of the Order of Polonia Restituta (1944–1989)
Burials at Powązki Cemetery